Kilimli is a belde (town) in the central district of  Zonguldak Province, Turkey. It is at the east end of Zonguldak, on the Black Sea shore, close to both Zonguldak and Çatalağzı, a town to the east of Kilimli.  The population of Kilimli is 24,393 as of 2010.  It is a relatively a new town, founded after coal mines around Zonguldak were discovered.  In 1927, the coal company of Kilimli was founded and Kilimli flourished. In 1936, together with the other mines around Kilimli, the company was bought by the government.  Presently, Kilimli is a typical mining town.

References

Populated places in Zonguldak Province
Towns in Turkey
Zonguldak Central District
Populated coastal places in Turkey